Attabira (Sl. No.: 4) is a Vidhan Sabha constituency of Bargarh district, Odisha.
This constituency includes Attabira, Attabira block and Bheden block. 
This constituency was created in 2009 in place of Melchhamunda constituency.

Elected members

Four elections held during 2009 to 2019. List of members elected from this constituency are:

 2019: Snehangini Chhuria (BJD)
 2014: Snehangini Chhuria (BJD)
 2009: Nihar Ranjan Mahananda (Congress)
 1951: Bipin Bihari Das (Congress)

Election results

2019
In 2019 election, Biju Janata Dal candidate Snehangini Chhuria defeated Indian Bharatiya Janata Party candidate Milan Seth by a margin of 22,396 votes.

2014 
In 2014 election, Biju Janata Dal candidate Snehangini Chhuria defeated Indian National Congress candidate Nihar Ranjan Mahananda by a margin of 25,474 votes.

2009 
In 2009 election Indian National Congress candidate Nihar Ranjan Mahananda, defeated Biju Janata Dal candidate Snehangini Chhuria by 13,329 votes.

Notes

References

Bargarh district
Assembly constituencies of Odisha